Yeshivat Kerem B'Yavneh (lit. Vineyard in Yavne Yeshiva) is a youth village and major yeshiva in southern Israel. Located near the city of Ashdod and adjacent to Kvutzat Yavne, it falls under the jurisdiction of Hevel Yavne Regional Council.

History

Founded in 1954, Kerem BeYavneh was the first Yeshivat Hesder. The first Rosh Yeshiva of Kerem B'Yavneh was the renowned scholar Rabbi Chaim Yaakov Goldvicht. Following his retirement, Goldvicht was succeeded by Rabbi Mordechai Greenberg, himself an alumnus of the yeshiva, and Rosh Kollel. In the summer zman of 5774, Rabbi Menachem Mendel Blachman was appointed to be the Associate Rosh Yeshiva to Rav Greenberg, shlita. The current Head of the Overseas Program is Rabbi David Zahtz

Like all Yeshivot Hesder, Kerem B'Yavneh is a religious Zionist institution, advocating the position that the State of Israel is a concrete step forward in the coming of the final redemption. It also has an open outlook towards western culture, both with faculty holding university degrees and students attending university.

Programs within the yeshiva include a Hesder track, a gap-year for overseas students, and a Kollel Rabbanut as well as a Kollel Ledayanut (a Kollel for training of religious court judges).

The yeshiva has an enrollment of around 300 students, including students from Israel and from overseas, most of whom reside in dormitories on campus. Overseas students come mainly from the United States, the United Kingdom, South Africa, and Canada, but also other countries.

Notable alumni
 Yigal Amir, assassin of Israeli Prime Minister Yitzhak Rabin
Rabbi Yehuda Amit, Rosh Yeshiva of Kiryat Malakhi
Rabbi Yisrael Ariel, Head of Machon Hamikdash (Temple Institute)
 Uri Bin Nun, director the Israel Electric Corporation
Rabbi Zephaniah Drori, Rav and Rosh Yeshiva of Kiryat Shmona
Rabbi Eytan Feiner, Rav of The White Shul in Far Rockaway, went to Yeshivas Ner Yisroel
Rabbi Yisroel Kaminetsky, Rosh HaYeshiva of Davis Renov Stahler Yeshiva High School for Boys (DRS Yeshiva High School) and Director of NCSY Summer Kollel
 Yitzhak Levy, Knesset member and government minister 
Rabbi Zalman Baruch Melamed, Rav and Rosh Yeshiva of Beit El
Rabbi Yona Metzger, former Ashkenazi Chief Rabbi of Israel
Rabbi  Ephraim Mirvis, current Chief Rabbi of the United Hebrew Congregations of the Commonwealth
 Ohad Moskowitz, successful Jewish singer
 Hanan Porat, Israeli politician
 Pesach Wolicki, Rosh Yeshiva of Yeshivat Yesodei HaTorah and associate director of CJCUC.

A number of the staff and rabbinic alumni at Yeshiva University's Rabbi Isaac Elchanan Theological Seminary studied at Kerem B'Yavneh, including:
Rabbi Meir Goldwicht, Rosh Yeshiva at Yeshiva University (RIETS)
Rabbi Mordechai Willig, Rosh Yeshiva at Yeshiva University (RIETS), Rav of Young Israel of Riverdale
Rabbi  Zvi Sobolofsky, Rosh Yeshiva at Yeshiva University (RIETS), Rav of Congregation Ohr Hatorah
Rabbi Baruch Simon, Rosh Yeshiva at Yeshiva University (RIETS)
Rabbi Yonason Sacks, Rosh Yeshiva at Lander College for Men, a former Rosh Yeshiva at Yeshiva University (RIETS), Rav of Agudas Yisroel of Passaic
Rabbi Aryeh Lebowitz, Director of Semikhah at RIETS and Mara D'asra of Beis Haknesses of North Woodmere, formerly a Maggid Shiur at Davis Renov Stahler Yeshiva High School for Boys (DRS Yeshiva High School) and at Lander College for Men

References

External links
Yeshivat Kerem B'Yavneh Official Website

Kerem B'Yavneh
Educational institutions established in 1954
Populated places established in 1954
Hevel Yavne Regional Council
Populated places in Central District (Israel)
1954 establishments in Israel
Youth villages in Israel